Brainiac: History Abuse is a British entertainment documentary show that aired on Sky1 from 1 June to 20 July 2005. It is a spin-off of the show Brainiac: Science Abuse concentrating on historical subjects. The show is presented by Charlotte Hudson with additional input from Stephen Wisdom as "Ernest Clough, History Buff", and Regina Cotter as Shell in the Kitchen cooking traditional medieval delicacies.

The series wasn't as popular as its scientific counterpart, and was axed after one series. However, it is repeated on Sky3.

Regular features include:
 "Men in Steel" and "Knight Fever" – highlighting modern-day activities you can do (with varying degrees of difficulty) while wearing a suit of armour.
 Shell's Kitchen – medieval (and to most modern tastes, unpalatable) recipes, presented in a parody of the style of Nigella Lawson.
 Ancient Hist-O-Wee – historical uses for urine
 Historical medicinal remedies
 Ancient Vege-Battles: historical battles illustrated using fruit and vegetables
 The Brainiac Battering Ram Squad "fixing" an everyday problem with unnecessary force, such as opening a vending machine or a locked car
 Like Brainiac: Science Abuse before it, the show always ends with an item in which a caravan gets blown up. In deference to the theme, they use a "historical" explosive for an everyday task (e.g. a WW2 depth charge to unblock a toilet).
 Torture instruments were shown and demonstrated with fruit

Releases 

Australian Release

Soundtrack 
Certain pieces of music are used repeatedly during the series, including:
 "Toxic" and "...Baby One More Time" by Britney Spears
 "Doctor Doctor" by the Thompson Twins
 "Stayin' Alive" by the Bee Gees
 "Everybody Hurts" by R.E.M.
 "Unbelievable" by EMF
 "Babies" by Pulp
 Theme from Get Carter by Roy Budd
 "Hysteria" by Muse

References

External links 
 

2005 British television series debuts
2005 British television series endings
Sky UK original programming
Television series by ITV Studios